Yorkshire League may refer to

The RFL Yorkshire League, one of the rugby league county leagues which ran between 1895 and 1970 as the premier rugby league competitions in the United Kingdom
The CMS Yorkshire league, an amateur rugby league competition in the United Kingdom
The Yorkshire Football League, which became part of the Northern Counties (East) League in 1982
 Yorkshire League (cricket), a cricket competition played for by clubs in Yorkshire